The Interservice/Industry Training, Simulation and Education Conference (I/ITSEC) is an annual conference in Orlando, Florida organized by the National Training and Simulation Association.

History

Attendance 
Peak attendance at I/ITSEC occurred in 2011, with approximately 20,000 attendees. Attendance declined to approximately 17,000 in 2012 and to 14,000 in 2013 and 2014 due to new restrictions with US military and government travel. As a result, conference leaders are taking steps to attract more international attendees, and they have begun expanding I/ITSEC's offerings to appeal to modeling, simulation, and training professionals who work in sectors outside of the defense and security sectors, such as healthcare, civil aviation, transportation, and disaster relief.

I/ITSEC 2019 Attendance Details
 Overall Attendance: 17,400
 Exhibit Visitors: 5,800
 Conference Attendees: 4,700
 Exhibit Personnel: 6,900
 International Visitors: 1,984 from 65 different countries
 Exhibiting Companies: 550 occupying 431 exhibit spaces in 191,800 net square feet

Growth and Evolution 
I/ITSEC first started as the “Naval Training Device Center/Industry Conference” in 1966, but its name changed as the conference expanded its focus since its inception.  Below is a short history of the names associated with I/ITSEC through the years:

Papers, Tutorials, and Workshops 
Each year, I/ITSEC requests submissions for papers and tutorials to be presented at its annual conference.  The peer-reviewed process spans half a year as prospective authors must pass multiple quality assurance gates.  Authors must first submit an abstract to one of the six sub-committees: education, emerging concepts and innovative technologies, human systems engineering, simulation, training, or the policy, standards, management, and acquisition subcommittee.  Each subcommittee consists of government, industry, and academic members.  At the abstract meeting, each submission is carefully considered and either accepted or rejected.  If accepted, the full paper submission is required a few months later to again be reviewed and either accepted or rejected.  Lastly, accepted authors must prepare presentations that are again reviewed by committee members. Abstract submission typically opens in February each year with full, accepted papers due sometime in June and presentations due around September. 

If accepted, authors present their tutorials on the first day of the conference (always held on a Monday). Speakers present their papers during concurrent sessions, held across the subsequent three days of the conference (Tuesday-Thursday). Finally, on the last day of the conference (Friday), invited speakers present special workshops, which are like the Monday tutorials but longer. Typically, each conference includes more than 160 of these educational sessions or special events. Attendees can earn Continuing Education Units (CEUs) at the tutorials, Friday workshops, and all paper sessions.

Exhibit Hall

The conference includes an exhibit hall, which typically comprises approximately 192,000 square feet and features over 550 organizations and agencies. In addition to commercial vendors, academic institutions and military agencies typically have exhibit hall booths. Frequently, organizations and agencies bring demonstrations of their technology wares. Previous exhibit displays have included: Computer-Based 3D graphics, Flight Simulators, Convoy Trainers, SCORM, Information Technology, Advanced Distributed Learning, Aerospace, Communications, Public Safety. Annually, the NTSA publishes short video clips of notable booths on their YouTube page: https://www.youtube.com/user/NTSAToday

Special Events 

Each year I/ITSEC hosts a series of special events that reflect emerging topics in the modeling, simulation, and training domain. Special events are devised by the committee members who organize the conference, and special event participants receive invitations versus completing the peer-reviewed paper/tutorial submission process. 
In 2015 there were 18 Special Events (a mix of Signature Events, Floor Events, and Focus Events) that included topics such as Live, Virtual, Constructive (LVC), How to predict and manage Black Swan events, artificial intelligence for social interaction simulation, transmedia learning, geospatial environment database standards, cybersecurity, and an Ignite (event) session with invited speakers. Frequently, these special events involve discussion panels, with high-ranking military and civilians personnel among the invited panelists. For instance, each year the conference includes a special event, called the “Congressional Modeling and Simulation Event,” where elected official discusses M&S policies; similarly, another special event, called the “General/Flag Officer Panel,” included active duty military officers and government civilians from the general/flag officer or Senior Executive Service echelons.

Serious Games Showcase and Challenge 
The Serious Games Showcase and Challenge is a competition and a showcase event that was created to encourage video game developers to create products that are useful for non-entertainment purposes.  The annual event, made its first appearance as an exhibit space at I/ITSEC in 2006.  The event accepts games from universities, businesses, and government organizations as entries in competition for awards prizes.
Each year the event awards a Special Emphasis Award, Students’ Choice Award, Best Business Game, Best Student Game, Best Government Game, Best Mobile Game, and finally, attendees at the conference can also vote on the People's Choice Award.

Awards and Scholarships

Best Paper and Best Tutorial Awards 
I/ITSEC presents annual awards in the following areas:
 Best paper per subcommittee
 Overall best paper, selected from the best papers from each subcommittee
 Best tutorial
Below are the Best Paper and Best Tutorial winners for the past 10 years. To see the full archive of winners, see the  Best Paper and Best Tutorial I/ITSEC page.

Outstanding Achievement Awards 
The NTSA confers professional achievement awards at the I/ITSEC conference to individuals, organizations, or project teams that have made significant contributions to the M&S discipline. These include the following categories: training, analysis, acquisition, cross-function (multiple uses), and individual/lifetime achievement.

I/ITSEC Fellows 
The NTSA established a Fellows recognition award in 2010. Conference leaders bestow the "I/ITSEC Fellow" title to an influential person whose contributions have fundamentally shaped contemporary simulation and training capabilities. Individuals receive this recognition by being nominated and meeting conference leadership's standards for merit; consequently, the number of Fellow awards varies by year.

Postgraduate and Undergraduate Student Scholarships 
Since 1990, the conference has awarded academic scholarships to graduate students. In 2019, the conference started to award scholarships to undergraduate students as well.

Outreach 
During I/ITSEC, the NTSA conducts outreach to students and teachers, primarily from the K-12 Science, Technology, Engineering, and Mathematics (STEM) fields. Outreach programs include the following:
 America’s Teachers Program: Sponsors the travel and conference attendance for K-12 teachers and school administrators
 Future Leaders Pavilion: Exhibit hall venue for secondary school students to demonstrate technical projects they have developed in modeling, simulation and training topics
 Student Tours: Guided tours of the conference, designed for school field trips

See also 
 Simulation
 modeling
 Military Simulation
 Simulation Interoperability Standards Organization
 MORS
 Operations Research
 NDIA

References

External links
I/ITSEC Web Site

Military simulation